Nick, King of the Chauffeurs is a 1925 German silent adventure film directed by Carl Wilhelm and starring Carlo Aldini.

The art direction was by Willi Herrmann.

Cast
In alphabetical order
 Carlo Aldini as Chauffeur Nick
 Oreste Bilancia as Bankier Mac H. Fulton
 Adolphe Engers as Morris W. Stanley
 Olga Engl as Fürstin Baranhoff
 Robert Garrison as Konsul Napoleon Schwarz
 Lillian Hackett as Tochter Fay
 Hermann Picha as Wagenwäscher Pannewitz
 Berthold Rose as Polizeikommissar Borghetti
 Hans Wilhelm as Graf Tatistchew

References

External links

1925 films
Films of the Weimar Republic
Films directed by Carl Wilhelm
German silent feature films
German black-and-white films
Phoebus Film films
1920s German films